The Bortle scale is a nine-level numeric scale that measures the night sky's brightness of a particular location. It quantifies the astronomical observability of celestial objects and the interference caused by light pollution. John E. Bortle created the scale and published it in the February 2001 edition of Sky & Telescope magazine to help amateur astronomers evaluate the darkness of an observing site, and secondarily, to compare the darkness of observing sites. The scale ranges from Class 1, the darkest skies available on Earth, through to Class 9, inner-city skies. It gives several criteria for each level beyond naked-eye limiting magnitude (NELM). The accuracy and utility of the scale have been questioned in recent research. The table below summarizes Bortle's descriptions of the classes. Some classes can have very drastic differences from the one next to it, e.g, Bortle 4 to 5.

In popular culture
The band Days N' Daze referenced the scale in the title and lyrics of their song Nine on the Bortle.

See also

4673 Bortle
Amateur astronomy
Dark-sky movement
The End of Night (book)
International Dark-Sky Association (IDA)
Light pollution
Night sky
Sky brightness
Sky & Telescope (S&T)

References

External links

 by Sky & Telescope
Interactive demo of the Bortle Scale
 International Dark-Sky Association
ObservingSites.com (North American sites only)

Amateur astronomy
Light pollution
Scales